Emeka Jude Ugali (born 28 May 1982) is a retired Nigerian football striker.

Career

Club
Withdrawn from Nigeria just sixteen where he played with Princess Jegede, he began his career in Serbian second-level side FK Beograd in season 1998–99.Next summer, he moved to Poland where he joined Ekstraklasa side Polonia Warsaw. During winter-break, he moved to Italy where he joined F.B.C. Unione Venezia, the team of Venice. From 2000 to 2004 plays in A.C. Monza Brianza 1912, where he lived the peak of his career. In the 2003-2004 Season, The Website Monza News index a poll for fans to vote for the best player of the season. Ugali withdraws the award ARREDOKIT TROPHY 2003–04.
In later years he played with several smaller teams, both amateur and Serie D.

International career
Ugali plays for the Nigerian national team, having collect 2 caps all in 2002.
His debut arrive at 4 May 2002 in Lagos against Kenya in a friendly match, ended 3-0 for the Nigerians.
The second and last appearance was at 18 May 2002 in London at Loftus Road against Jamaica always in a friendly match, ended 0-0.

Disputes 
On 23 September 2001, during the match of Serie C1: A.C. Monza Brianza 1912-Pisa Calcio (1-2), Ugali was ejected by the referee Latella from Potenza because the Nigerian player dropped his shorts after a Pisa player had called him "nigger". 
The President of Calcio Monza, Cesare D'Evant, said after the match that while condemning the incident of racism, that it did not justify the reaction of his player.

References

1982 births
Living people
Nigerian footballers
Nigerian expatriate footballers
Expatriate footballers in Italy
Nigeria international footballers
A.C. Monza players
Venezia F.C. players
Serie B players
Serie C players
Serie D players
U.S. 1913 Seregno Calcio players
Association football forwards
FK Beograd players
Expatriate footballers in Serbia and Montenegro
Polonia Warsaw players
Expatriate footballers in Poland